The Volme is a river in North Rhine-Westphalia, Germany, and is a tributary of the river Ruhr. Its largest tributary is the Ennepe.

In the city of Hagen, the Volme is predominantly canalised, and since 2004 has been under restoration.

Tributaries of the Volme are, from the mouth upstream:
Ennepe (in Hagen centre)
Sterbecke (in Hagen-Rummenohl)
Hälver (in Schalksmühle)
Elspe (in Lüdenscheid-Brügge)
Wiebelsaat (in Meinerzhagen)

Industrial development
In the pre-industrial age, numerous mills, smithies and foundries arose along the Volme, from which the iron industry developed during the 19th and the 20th centuries. The Hagen–Dieringhausen railway runs through the valley.

See also
 List of rivers of North Rhine-Westphalia

References

Rivers of North Rhine-Westphalia
Rivers of Germany